is a 1957 Japanese comedy film directed by Yūzō Kawashima with a screenplay by Kawashima, Shōhei Imamura and Keiichi Tanaka. It was voted the fifth best Japanese film of all time in a poll of 140 Japanese critics and filmmakers conducted by the magazine Kinema Junpo in 1999.

Plot
It is set during the last days of the Bakumatsu era (1862), six years before the shogun Tokugawa Yoshinobu returned power to the Emperor. The plot is centered around the rogue city dweller Saheiji (played by comedian Frankie Sakai), who arrived to have fun with three friends. They visit a brothel in the Shinagawa entertainment district. After spending the night, he was forced to admit that he lacked money to pay. So he must stay in order to settle his debt. Saheiji seeks to outwit the inhabitants of a brothel in order to survive in straitened times. Meanwhile, a group of samurai seek to destroy any foreigners that cross their path. Saheiji attracts all employees, from brothel owners to prostitutes, successfully resolves any disputes with clients by using his inherent brilliance, wit and fill his pockets. However, gradually it turns out that the seemingly life-loving Saheiji suffers from tuberculosis and his future is uncertain.

Notes
Parallels are drawn between the world of the samurai and the world of Kawashima's Japan. The hypocrisy surrounding prostitution, about to be outlawed in Japan at that time in 1950s Japan, the abuse of power, and financial greed at a time of crisis, are all portrayed.

Cast 
 Frankie Sakai as Saheiji
 Yōko Minamida as Koharu
 Sachiko Hidari as Osome
 Yujiro Ishihara as Takasugi Shinsaku
 Nobuo Kaneko as Denbei, the owner of the Sagami-ya
 Masumi Okada as Kisuke
 Tomio Aoki as Chusuke
 Shōichi Ozawa as Kinzō, the book lender
 Shōbun Inoue as Genta
 Toshio Takahara as Kaneji
 Izumi Ashikawa as Ohisa
 Akira Nishimura as Shinkō
 Taiji Tonoyama as Kurazō
 Hideaki Nitani as Shidō Monta (a.k.a. Inoue Kaoru)
 Akira Kobayashi as Kusaka Genzui

Reception 
The Japanese filmmaker Akira Kurosawa cited Sun in the Last Days of the Shogunate as one of his 100 favorite films.

References

External links 
 
 New remaster Ver(2011) http://www.nikkatsu.com/bakumatsu/english.html

1957 films
1957 comedy films
Japanese black-and-white films
Japanese comedy films
1950s Japanese-language films
Films directed by Yuzo Kawashima
Nikkatsu films
Jidaigeki films
Samurai films
1950s martial arts films
Films about prostitution in Japan
Films set in Bakumatsu
1950s Japanese films